Medingen may refer to:

Medingen (Bad Bevensen), a village in Lower Saxony, Germany
Medingen, Luxembourg, a village in southern Luxembourg

See also
Medingen Abbey, a former nunnery in Medingen, Germany